GBA-9 (Skardu-III) is a constituency of Gilgit Baltistan Assembly which is currently represented by Wazir Muhammad Saleem an independent Member.

Members

Election results

2009
Sheikh Nisar of PPP became member of assembly by getting 6,432 votes.

2015
Fida Muhammad Nashad of PML-N won this seat by getting 6,246 votes.

References

Gilgit-Baltistan Legislative Assembly constituencies